The Church of St Michael in Buckland Dinham, Somerset, England, has been designated as a Grade I listed building.

The church has a nave, chancel, south chapel and south porch which date from around 1200. The north chapel was added in 1325, and a further chapel to the north of the chancel and the west tower being added in 1480. It underwent restoration in the late 19th century.

The tower contains six bells which were not rung between the 1950s and 1990s when a restoration project was undertaken including the addition of a bell from St Paul's Church, Bristol.

The Anglican parish is part of the Mells with Buckland Dinham, Elm, Whatley and Chantry benefice within the archdeaconry of Wells.

See also

 List of Grade I listed buildings in Mendip
 List of towers in Somerset
 List of ecclesiastical parishes in the Diocese of Bath and Wells

References

13th-century church buildings in England
Churches completed in 1325
Religious buildings and structures completed in 1480
15th-century church buildings in England
Grade I listed churches in Somerset
Church of England church buildings in Mendip District
Grade I listed buildings in Mendip District